5'-AMP-activated protein kinase subunit gamma-2 is an enzyme that in humans is encoded by the PRKAG2 gene.

Function 

AMP-activated protein kinase (AMPK) is a heterotrimeric protein composed of a catalytic alpha subunit, a noncatalytic beta subunit, and a noncatalytic regulatory gamma subunit. Various forms of each of these subunits exist, encoded by different genes. AMPK is an important energy-sensing enzyme that monitors cellular energy status and functions by inactivating key enzymes involved in regulating de novo biosynthesis of fatty acid and cholesterol. This gene is a member of the AMPK gamma subunit family and encodes a protein with four CBS domains. Mutations in this gene have been associated with ventricular pre-excitation (Wolff–Parkinson–White syndrome), progressive conduction system disease and cardiac hypertrophy. Alternate transcriptional splice variants, encoding different isoforms, have been characterized.

Interactions
PRKAG2 has been shown to interact with PRKAB2 and PRKAB1.

References

Further reading

External links
  GeneReviews/NCBI/NIH/UW entry on Familial Hypertrophic Cardiomyopathy Overview

EC 2.7.11